A case file or casefile is a collection of evidence or documents relating to a legal, medical, or social work case. It may also refer to:

Media 
Canadian Case Files, a 2005 TV series about the investigation of unsolved crimes in Canada.
Casefile, an Australian true crime podcast that first aired in January 2016
Cold Case Files, a reality legal show/documentary on the cable channel A&E Network (1999–present)
Wild Case Files, a documentary TV series that premiered in the UK in July 2006

Music 
The Case Files, a 2011 compilation album by singer-songwriter Peter Case
Cold Case Files, a 2008 compilation album by rap group Onyx

Novels/comics 
Case Files: Sam & Twitch, part of the Sam and Twitch comic series, first published in 2013
The Case Files of Lord El-Melloi II (2014–2019), free file a Japanese manga series
The Hardy Boys Casefiles, a 2010–2011 series of graphic novels
The Kindaichi Case Files, the 1992-2017 Japanese mystery manga series

Software 
L.A. Noire: The VR Case Files, a 2011 detective video game published by Rockstar Games
Mystery Case Files (MCF), a video game series first released in 2005
Mystery Case Files novels, four novels based on the video game series
Virtual Case File (VCF), an application developed by the FBI between 2000 and 2005
The X-Files: Unrestricted Access, a 1997 video game

See also 
Case (disambiguation)
Casebook (disambiguation)